Hudsons may refer to

Hudsons Coffee, an Australian chain of coffee retailers
Hudson's, a defunct chain of retail department stores based in Detroit